The Lawford Islands are an island group located inside western Coronation Gulf, south of Victoria Island, in the Kitikmeot Region, Nunavut, Canada. Other island groups in the vicinity include the Berens Islands, Black Berry Islands, Couper Islands, Deadman Islands, Leo Islands, and Sir Graham Moore Islands.

References

 Lawford Islands at the Atlas of Canada.

Islands of Coronation Gulf
Uninhabited islands of Kitikmeot Region